Mariapolder is a polder and hamlet in the Dutch province of South Holland located near Strijensas and is part of the municipality of Hoeksche Waard.

Mariapolder is not a statistical entity, and considered part of Strijensas. It has a little harbour and World War II bunkers.

References

Populated places in South Holland
Hoeksche Waard